La sirène is an opéra comique in 3 acts by Daniel Auber to a libretto by Eugène Scribe, premiered 26 March 1844.

Recording
Auber: La Sirène Les Métaboles & Orchestre des Frivolites Parisiennes, David Reiland 1CD Naxos 8.660436 (2019)

References

operas
1844 operas
Operas by Daniel Auber 
Libretti by Eugène Scribe 
French-language operas